Kuno Cirque is a glacier-filled cirque between Glen Glacier and Murchison Cirque on the south side of the Read Mountains, Shackleton Range, Antarctica. The feature was photographed from the air by the U.S. Navy, 1967, and surveyed by the British Antarctic Survey, 1968–71. In association with the names of geologists grouped in this area, it was named by the UK Antarctic Place-Names Committee in 1971 after Professor Hisashi Kuno (1910–69), a Japanese petrologist who worked on basaltic magmas.

References

Cirques of Coats Land